Aravella Simotas (born October 9, 1978) is an American politician who represented District 36, covering parts of Western Queens, including Astoria and parts of Long Island City, in the New York State Assembly as a member of the Democratic Party.

Education and early life
Simotas was born in Rhodesia. She immigrated to the United States from Greece and settled in Astoria with her parents and brother when she was an infant. She graduated from P.S. 17, Junior H.S. 126, and William C. Bryant High School.

She received a B.A. degree (summa cum laude) from Fordham University in 1999, followed by a J.D. degree from the Fordham University School of Law in 2002. During law school, she was the managing editor at the Fordham Environmental Law Journal.

Early career
Simotas began her career in public service as a district representative for Speaker of the New York City Council, Peter Vallone Sr. and later for New York City Council member Peter Vallone Jr. While at law school, she also worked at the New York State Department of Environmental Conservation.

After law school, Simotas served as a law clerk at the United States Court of International Trade and  later practiced law in New York City.

Simotas served as a member of the Queens Community Planning Board 1 and the United Community Civic Association.

Electoral history

2010 election
Simotas was first elected to office in 2010. She received the Democratic Party nomination and ran unopposed in the November 2, 2010, general election.

2012 election
Simotas was unopposed in the 2012 Democratic primary. In the general election, she ran on both the Democratic and Working Families Party lines and was opposed by Republican Julia Haitch.

According to preliminary results collected by the Daily News, Simotas won re-election to the State Assembly, for the new District 36, in the general election on November 6, 2012, with 84% of the vote.

2020 election
She lost her 2020 Democratic primary to Democratic Socialist Zohran Mamdani.

Committee assignments
Simotas's Committee Assignments as of 2018 included:
Chair, Committee on Ethics and Guidance
Co-chair, Legislative Ethics Commission
 Insurance
 Judiciary
 Ways and Means
 Energy 

Simotas was appointed Chair of the Assembly's Ethics and Guidance Committee in 2017. Under her leadership, the Committee updated the Assembly's policy prohibiting harassment and discrimination to require expedited investigations and expand the types of conduct violating the policy.

From 2014 to 2017, Simotas served as Chair of the Assembly's Task Force on Women's Issues and Administrative and Regulatory Review Commission.

Policy positions

Sexual violence 
In 2012, Simotas introduced the "Rape is Rape" bill to expand the definition of rape in New York State law to include forced anal and oral sexual contact. The bill has passed in the Assembly every year since 2013.

Simotas sponsored legislation in 2016 to combat the rape kit backlog by mandating timely processing and testing of rape kits. In 2017, she introduced legislation to establish a Sexual Assault Survivors' Bill of Rights and prevent premature destruction of evidence. The bill was signed into law in 2018.

In 2019, the legislature passed Simotas' bill to extend New York's five-year statute of limitations for second- and third-degree rape to 20 years and 10 years, respectively.

Simotas authored a package of bills aimed at strengthening protections against sexual harassment in the workplace and pushed the legislature to hold the first public hearings on the subject in 27 years. In June 2019, the legislature passed Simotas' bill to eliminate the severe or pervasive standard for harassment claims, extend the time period for employees to file complaints, hold employers accountable for harassment committed by supervisors, and establish protections for workers who sign non-disclosure agreements.

Simotas has sponsored a series of bills to combat sexual abuse in medical settings. The bills would require health care providers to undergo background checks as a condition of licensure, expand the information about patients' rights and reporting options available online, and require doctors who are disciplined for misconduct to notify their patients.

Health care 
In 2015, legislation introduced by Simotas made New York the first state in the country to designate pregnancy as a qualifying event to enroll in health insurance through the state health exchange.

In 2016, Simotas introduced the Fair Access to Fertility Treatment Act to require insurers to cover in vitro fertilization, as well as fertility preservation services for cancer patients. Provisions of Simotas' proposal were enacted as part of the 2019-2020 state budget.

Simotas introduced legislation to establish a Newborn Health and Safe Sleep Pilot Program to combat infant mortality by distributing "baby boxes", essential care items and educational materials to new parents in high-risk areas. The bill was signed into law in October 2017.

LGBTQ rights 
Simotas voted in favor of same-sex marriage in New York. Simotas had been a lead sponsor ("co-sponsor") of Assembly Bill A08354, which passed the Assembly by an 80–63 vote,
later passed the Senate, and was signed into law by Governor Andrew Cuomo. Since she first took office, Simotas supported the Gender Expression Non-Discrimination Act (GENDA), for which she was a "multi-sponsor".

Criminal justice
In 2019, Simotas introduced legislation to close a loophole in New York's Raise the Age law to expand eligibility for record sealing.

Simotas voted against rollbacks to bail reform in the FY 2020-2021 state budget.

Energy and environment
Simotas served as chairperson of Smart Power NY, a coalition to develop new energy sources for Western Queens. One of its goals was to support the replacement of "decades-old, dirty" power plants in Astoria with newer generators.

Other issues 

Simotas has pushed for the allocation of additional polling sites and the expansion of early voting.

Simotas joined several other public officials in protesting against the anti-immigrant Greek organization, Golden Dawn, which held a recruitment meeting in Queens. Simotas said that the anti-immigrant message was not welcome in her community; she expressed anger because she is an immigrant herself.

Simotas has supported the expansion of Mount Sinai Queens hospital, which is undergoing a $125 million building project, noting the expanding population of western Queens and the necessity of increased healthcare opportunities to meet the needs of a growing community.

In 2013, Simotas supported the retention and expansion of Gifted and Talented programs in her district. Simotas has assisted in keeping local public schools open and functioning in her district, including Long Island City High School, which has been threatened with closing or "co-location" (consolidation) since the early 2010s.

Simotas has pushed for cleaner streets in Astoria, calling upon Mayor Bill de Blasio to take action and reduce street waste and litter.

Personal life
Simotas is married to John Katsanos, and they have one daughter, born in 2012.

References

External links
 Official biography at the New York State Assembly website
 Campaign website
 Interview  on YNN regarding improvements to power plants (video link)

1978 births
Living people
 
Fordham University alumni
Greek emigrants to the United States
Democratic Party members of the New York State Assembly
People from Astoria, Queens
Women state legislators in New York (state)
21st-century American politicians
21st-century American women politicians